Libertad is both a Spanish surname and a given name meaning "freedom". Notable people with the name include:

Surname:
Albert Libertad (1875–1908), pseudonym of Albert Joseph, anarchist writer and activist
Tania Libertad (born 1952), Afro-Peruvian singer

Given name:
Libertad Lamarque (1908–2000), Argentine torch-singer and motion picture actress
Libertad Leblanc (1938–2021), Argentine motion picture actress known for her role in The Pink Pussy:  Where Sin Lives

Spanish-language surnames